Bluff Point State Park is a public recreation area and nature preserve on an undeveloped peninsula located between the Poquonnock River and Mumford Cove on Long Island Sound in the town of Groton, Connecticut. The state park's  encompass a barrier beach, steep cliffs, forested sections, and tidal wetlands;  are designated as a coastal reserve. Recreational opportunities include hiking, mountain biking, boating, saltwater fishing, and shell fishing. The park is managed by the Connecticut Department of Energy and Environmental Protection.

History 
The Pequot people used the area now called Bluff Point as a source of seafood. Pequot means "people of the shallow water," and Pequot ancestors lived along the coast of Connecticut in villages near cleared land (called poquonnock), where they planted corn, squash, and beans. They ate fish and shellfish from the estuaries. Pequot people also made wampum (beads) from quahog and shelk shells, which were valuable for trading with other tribes in the region.

European colonists arrived in the 1630s. After the 1637 Pequot War, the Pequot tribal lands around Bluff Point were claimed and colonized by the English.

In 1649, the Town of New London granted John Winthrop the Younger a plot of land that became the plantation called Winthrop's Neck. It included present day Bluff Point State Park, Haley Farm State Park, Poquonnock Bridge, Mumford Cove, and Groton Long Point. The property was subsequently divided into Great Farm, also known as Bluff Point, and the Fort Hill Farm.

The farm building called Winthrop House was constructed on Bluff Point circa 1712 by Edward Yeomans on land leased from the Winthrop family. When it burned down in 1962, it left only a chimney standing that would later be used to reconstruct the Ebenezer Avery House's chimney after its relocation to Fort Griswold. The foundations of the farmhouse are still visible. The farm's crops included blackberry bushes and apple trees which continue to thrive. In the early 20th century, Bluff Point was part of an area known as Poquonnock Farm that was leased for potato farming by John Abbott Ackley.

In 1892, Walter Denison opened a summer resort on Bushy Point. As interest in camping rose in the 1910s, Bluff Point became a popular destination by the 1920s. Tents and shacks grew into a small community of summer cottages by the 1930s. The owner of the property decided to stop subleasing the property in June 1938, with the termination in October 1 and the removal of the structures by November 1. Leary writes, "[b]efore a legal protest could be mounted, nature adjudicated the issue. On September 21, 1938, a massive hurricane came ashore at high tide. Except for the old Winthrop place, it destroyed nearly every building on the site." Some 106 homes were lost.

Bluff Point was proposed as a state recreation facility as early as 1914. The state acquired the western one-third of Bluff Point from Henry A. Gardiner III in 1963. During that time, the State sought to acquire the land because Bluff Point was the "last remaining significant portion of undeveloped shoreline in Connecticut" and that its "rocky bluffs standing behind narrow beaches typified the Connecticut coast." The Bluff Point Advisory Council, a committee formed of local citizen groups and government representatives, successfully petitioned the state to acquire the land and protect it. The Connecticut legislature established Bluff Point as a Coastal Reserve in 1975. The act gave Bluff Point State Park the highest possible protection in the State Park system and serves to protect the high number of endangered and threatened species that are found within the park.

According to legend, a boulder on the beach, known as Split Rock, suddenly split with "the sound of a cannon shot" in January 1780. Leary notes that it was likely split by freezing water that expanded in a crack in the rock. Sunset Rock was used by residents of the summer community for meetings and religious services; the sunset can no longer be seen from the rock.

Plants and animals
Diverse flora can be found at Bluff Point, owing to an intermingling of habitat areas including salt marshes, coastal woodlands, dunes and intertidal grass beds.  This array of habitats also contributes to the broad range of birds found at the park.  Several uncommon species of gulls, shorebirds and landbirds are among the more than 200 species of birds that have been observed throughout Bluff Point. In contrast, terrestrial animals residing in the park are of fairly common species, including deer, coyotes, foxes and smaller mammals such as rabbits, raccoons and opossums.  Offshore wildlife includes horseshoe crabs, clams, mussels, snails and a multitude of crustaceans.

Activities and amenities
The park is notable for bird watching; over 200 species have been seen at the site. Other activities include picnicking, saltwater fishing, shell fishing, hiking, horseback riding, and mountain biking. A ramp for car-top boating is available. Fish caught at Bluff Point include striped bass, sea trout, bluefish, and summer flounder.

References

External links

Bluff Point State Park Connecticut Department of Energy and Environmental Protection
Bluff Point State Park & Coastal Reserve Map Connecticut Department of Energy and Environmental Protection

State parks of Connecticut
Parks in New London County, Connecticut
Protected areas established in 1963
1963 establishments in Connecticut
Groton, Connecticut